Klaus Meetz (born 23 May 1946) is a German volleyball player. He competed in the men's tournament at the 1972 Summer Olympics.

References

1946 births
Living people
German men's volleyball players
Olympic volleyball players of West Germany
Volleyball players at the 1972 Summer Olympics
Sportspeople from Hamburg